Lože is a village in the Vipava Valley in the Municipality of Vipava in the traditional Inner Carniola region of Slovenia. It is now generally regarded as part of the Slovenian Littoral.

Castle

Seventeenth-century Leitenburg Castle (a.k.a. Lože Castle) is located just outside the village.

References

External links
Lože at Geopedia

Populated places in the Municipality of Vipava